The Free State province of South Africa is divided, for local government purposes, into one metropolitan municipality (Mangaung) and four district municipalities. The district municipalities are in turn divided into eighteen local municipalities.

In the following map, the district and metropolitan municipalities are labelled in capital letters and shaded in various different colours.

District and metropolitan municipalities

Local government municipalities

Former municipalities
These municipalities have been dissolved since the current system of local government was established in 2000.

References

 
Free State
Free State (province)-related lists